Olin platnicki is the only species in the monotypic spider genus Olin in the family Trachycosmidae. It is native to Christmas Island and Sulawesi.

Taxonomy
The genus and species were first described in 2001 by Christa L. Deeleman-Reinhold. The generic name "Olin" was a random combination of letters, and the specific name "platnicki" is in honour of Norman Platnick.

Characteristics
Olin has long and projected chelicerae, and a relatively broad and low carapace, with the maxillae long and nearly parallel, with depressions laterally. There is little sexual dimorphism and no elongation on the fourth trochanter or coxae.

References

Trochanteriidae
Spiders described in 2001
Spiders of Asia